Tangla railway station is a railway station located at Tangla in Udalguri district of Assam, India. The station has daily trains to Kamakhya, New Jalpaiguri, Rangiya and Naharlagun.

Opened
The railway station was re-opened on 4 January 2014 after gauge conversion from meter-gauge to broad-gauge.

References

External links
 

Railway stations in Udalguri district
Rangiya railway division